Norketamine, or N-desmethylketamine, is the major active metabolite of ketamine, which is formed mainly by CYP3A4. Similarly to ketamine, norketamine acts as a noncompetitive NMDA receptor antagonist (Ki = 1.7 μM and 13 μM for (S)-(+)-norketamine and (R)-(–)-norketamine, respectively), but is about 3–5 times less potent as an anesthetic in comparison. Also, similarly again to ketamine, norketamine binds to the μ- and κ-opioid receptors. Relative to ketamine, norketamine is much more potent as an antagonist of the α7-nicotinic acetylcholine receptor, and produces rapid antidepressant effects in animal models which have been reported to correlate with its activity at this receptor. However, norketamine is about 1/5 as potent as ketamine as an antidepressant in mice as per the forced swim test, and this seems also to be in accordance with its 3–5-fold reduced comparative potency in vivo as an NMDA receptor antagonist. Norketamine is metabolized into dehydronorketamine and hydroxynorketamine, which are far less or negligibly active as NMDA receptor antagonists in comparison, but retain activity as potent antagonists of the α7-nicotinic acetylcholine receptor.

References 

Arylcyclohexylamines
Antidepressants
Chloroarenes
Dissociative drugs
General anesthetics
Human drug metabolites
Kappa-opioid receptor agonists
Ketones
Mu-opioid receptor agonists
Nicotinic antagonists
NMDA receptor antagonists
Sedatives